Dallas County Courthouse may refer to:

 Dallas County Courthouse (Alabama) or Joseph T. Smitherman Historic Building
 Dallas County Courthouse (Arkansas)
 Dallas County Courthouse (Iowa)
 Dallas County Courthouse (Texas)